Amore Joveah Wiggins, formerly known as Opelika Jane Doe (born January 1, 2006 – ) was a formerly unidentified murder victim whose skeletal remains were found in a trailer park in Opelika, Alabama. Her identity was not known until nearly 11 years later in January 2023. Wiggins's father, Lamar Vickerstaff, was subsequently charged with felony murder and failure to report a missing child, while her step-mother, Ruth Vickerstaff, was charged with the latter. If convicted, Lamar would face up to life imprisonment without the possibility parole or the death penalty, and Ruth would face up to 10 years in prison.

Discovery
On January 28, 2012, a resident discovered a skull at Brook Haven Trailer Park, 1775 Hurst St. in Opelika, Alabama. Police searched the surrounding area and found more remains, including a pink, long sleeve shirt with heart buttons and ruffles nearby on a creek bank. It is unknown if that shirt belonged to the victim.

Investigation

Detectives determined the skull belonged to a young African American girl, around 4–7 years of age. Evidence from her bones indicated she was malnourished, and she also had a visible deformity on her left eye. This could be natural or a result of injury or abuse. Forensic artists at the National Center for Missing & Exploited Children created an image of what Jane Doe may have looked like. Detectives looked at school and birth records, but this yielded no results. In 2017, the University of South Florida Institute for Forensic Anthropology & Applied Science performed isotope testing on her bones, which indicated she lived in Southeastern United States.

Vacation Bible School sighting

In September 2016, a former Vacation Bible school teacher at the Greater Peace Church in Opelika provided photos of a child who resembled Wiggins that were taken in the summer of 2011. She would have been 4–5 years old. The teacher said she had a slightly unkempt appearance and was not very clean. She had trouble communicating with other children and was quiet and stayed to herself. The teacher did not remember her name and the church did not formally register children so there were no records. The church was located 10 minutes from where Wiggins's remains were found.

Police used software to enhance the image, hoping someone in the public would recognize the girl.

Further investigation
The Opelika Police Department teamed up with Othram laboratories to use advanced DNA testing and investigative genetic genealogy.

Based on tips, detectives believed the unidentified child may have had ties to Orlando, Florida, southeastern Virginia or northeastern North Carolina.

Identification
In January 2022, Opelika Jane Doe's remains were sent to Othram's laboratory in The Woodlands, Texas. A DNA extract from the remains was used to build a comprehensive genealogical profile, which was uploaded to a genealogical database. The Opelika Police Department retained Barbara Rae-Venter, known for helping police investigators identify the Golden State Killer, to produce investigative leads which were returned to Opelika Police Department.

In January 2023, Othram confirmed that Opelika Jane Doe has been identified as Amore Joveah Wiggins. 50-year-old Lamar Vickerstaff was identified as Amore's father in October 2022. He was born and raised in Opelika, Alabama, before he enlisted in the US Navy. He also spent time in Norfolk, Virginia, Honolulu, Hawaii, and Jacksonville, Florida.

In December 2022, Opelika detectives traveled to Mayport Naval Station in Jacksonville where he was stationed at the time to notify him of his daughter's death. Vickerstaff did not provide any information to authorities regarding his daughter's identity. Vickerstaff's wife, Ruth, to whom he was married since May 2006, told detectives that she did not know who Vickerstaff's daughter was or who was her mother.

Rae-Venter identified the biological mother to be Sherry Wiggins, who resided in Maryland. In December 2022, aged 37, she confirmed she was the biological mother of Amore. Wiggins was a native of Norfolk, and provided documentation showing that the Vickerstaffs obtained legal and physical custody of her daughter in 2009. At that time, her visitation with Amore was suspended. She also provided documents showing that she had continuously paid child support to Vickerstaff since 2009.

Arrests 
On January 17, 2023, the Vickerstaffs were arrested in Jacksonville, Florida. Vickerstaff was charged with felony murder and his wife was arrested for failure to report a missing child. They are currently being held at the Jacksonville Sheriff's Office pending extradition to Lee County, Alabama.

References

Unidentified murder victims in the United States
Murdered American children
Unsolved murders in the United States
People murdered in Alabama
Unidentified American children
Crimes against children
Female murder victims
Incidents of violence against girls
Murdered African-American people